Bernard-Raymond Fabré-Palaprat (29 May 1773 – 18 February 1838), presented a neo-Templar order  called l'Ordre du Temple in 1804 and the Johannite Church in 1812, and proclaimed himself Grand Master of the Templars and Sovereign Pontiff of the Primitive Catholic religion, opposing the Church of Saint Peter.

Early life
Bernard-Raymond Fabré-Palaprat was the son of a surgeon and nephew of a priest in the diocese of Cahors.  He studied at the diocesan seminary and was ordained a priest. Leaving the priesthood, he studied medicine in Montpellier and Caen, where he received his medical degree on 12 April 1798. Moving to Paris the same year, he obtained another medical degree on 16 September 1803, and became the director general of the Société médico-philantropique.

Order of the Temple
On 4 November 1804 Fabré-Palaprat founded the Order of the Temple  and revealed the existence of the Larmenius Charter (or "Charter of Transmission"). Knights of the Order were always addressed as "Sir Knights". The Grand Master of the Order was addressed as "Most Eminent Highness, Very Great, Powerful, and Excellent Prince, and Most Serene Lord."

The Larmenius Charter, allegedly written in Latin in 1324, listed 22 successive Grand Masters of the Knights Templar from 1324 to 1804, Fabré-Palaprat's name appearing last on the list. The Charter is named after Johannes Marcus Larmenius, the purported author of the document who, according to the Charter, was appointed Grand Master by Jacques de Molay while imprisoned, also having the power to appoint his successor (Thomas Theobaldus Alexandrinus in 1324; the first name on the list). The list of Grand Masters in the Larmenius Charter differs from the list of 'Scottish' Grand Masters given by the German Strict Observance, who produced no document, and the Larmenius Charter also anathematized the 'Scottish' Templars, who were excommunicated by Johannes Marcus Larmenius in 1324, who declared them "Deserters of The Temple".

Fabré-Palaprat's Order of the Temple claimed to possess significant relics: the sword of Jacques de Molay, the helmet of Guy Dauphin d'Auvergne, the Beausant, and four fragments of burnt bones taken from the funeral pyre where Jacques de Molay had been executed. These relics, described as "The Sacred Treasure of The Order of The Temple" in the Manual of the order (and described within an Inventory in the Statutes of the order), were displayed in March 1808 on the anniversary of Jacques de Molay's death, when members of the Order celebrated a public requiem for the 'martyred' Grand Master in the Church of St. Paul in Paris.

Johannite Church
In 1812 Fabré-Palaprat formed the Johannite Church, introducing faith-based elements into his order. He later ordained Ferdinand-François Châtel, a radical clergyman who left the priesthood following the July Revolution, as Primate of the Johannite church, on 4 May 1831. Châtel established his new French Catholic Church (Eglise Catholique Française) in former shop premises in Montmartre, decorating it with the bust of Louis Philippe I placed under the Tricolour flag. The Johannite church was located in a former bottle shop in the Cour des miracles, dubbed the "Apostolic Court of the Temple". The Order dated its documents from 'Magistropolis', a mystical calendar commencing from the foundation of the Knights Templar in 1118.

In 1831, following the July Revolution, Fabré-Palaprat published the Evangelikon, a Gnostic version of the Gospel of John that omits intra-textual commentary and the Resurrection narrative, preceded by an introduction and a commentary allegedly written by Nicephorus, a Greek monk of Athens, that carries the name Lévitikon. The Lévitikon contains an esoteric lineage from Jesus to the Knights Templar, and hints that Jesus was an initiate of the mysteries of Osiris, which were passed on to John the Beloved. Fabré-Palaprat claimed to have bought this vellum manuscript (allegedly dating from the 15th century), from a Paris second-hand bookstall on New Year's Day in 1814. It was translated into English for the first time in 2010.

Fabré-Palaprat introduced a Johannite Mass in 1834. The title "Christ" was reserved not just for Jesus but used for all leaders of the Johannite tradition who had attained Gnosis, similar to deification in the Orthodox Church.

In 1836 a schism, led by the Duc de Choiseul resulted out of dissatisfaction with the new Johannite church that had replaced the previous chivalric-style order. Fabré-Palaprat responded by admitting Sir Sidney Smith to the Johannite church.
The Duc de Choiseul was later elected Grand Master of the Order of the Temple in 1838, dying the same year.

Sir Sidney Smith was invited to take over as Grand Master of the Order, an offer he declined, but consented to preside over as Regent until a successor to Fabré-Palaprat had been chosen (which did not happen during his lifetime).

Distinctions
Fabré-Palaprat was awarded the Legion of Honour for his defence of Paris in 1814, and received the July Medal for his actions during the Three Glorious Days of the Revolution of 1830.

"Memoir of the Late M. Bernard Raymond Fabré-Palaprat, Grand Master of the Order of the Temple" was published by Robert Bigsby the Younger, in The Miscellaneous Poems and Essays of Robert Bigsby (London: Whittaker And Co., 1842).

Aftermath
The Regency of the Order of the Temple was at one stage passed on to Joséphin Péladan, later becoming amalgamated among other occult groups headed by Papus, finally becoming legally incorporated by a Belgian group known as the Ordre Souverain et Militaire du Temple de Jérusalem, OSMTJ. Today, this group operates as a Christian chivalric order and charitable organization. As well as with the Ordre Souverain du Temple Initiatique Sovereign Order of the Initiatory Temple (OSTI).

The Sovereign Order of the Initiatory Temple (OSTI), and its outer order known as International Circle for Cultural and Scientific Research (CIRCES International), with CIRCES being created by Raymond Bernard in 1988. Raymond Bernard describes his initiation into the OSTI in 1955, and the mission he was charged with for bringing OSTI public, in his 1966 book entitled A Secret Meeting In Rome. Raymond Bernard created CIRCES International as an outward Templar vehicle to eventually prepare people for initiation into the inner Order of the OSTI. CIRCES International also continues to protect and perpetuate L'Ordre Martiniste of Papus, which Joseph Péladan had been initiated into.

Selected works
 Lévitikon: ou Exposé des principes fondamentaux de la doctrine des chrétiens-catholiques-primitifs: suivi de leurs évangiles, d'un extrait de la Table d'or... et précédé du statut sur le gouvernement de l'Eglise et la hiérarchie lévitique (Paris: Librairie des Chrétiens-primitifs: J. Machault, 1831).
 Épître du souverain pontife et patriarche de la religion chrétienne catholique primitive (Paris: Ladvocat, 1831).
 De l'Église chrétienne-primitive et du catholicisme romain de nos jours, par une réunion d'ecclésiastiques (Paris: Houdaille, 1833).
 Jérusalem et Rome, débats entre les journalistes protecteurs du catholicisme romain de nos jours et les conservateurs du christianisme de l'Église primitive, pour faire suite au livre "De l'Église chrétienne-primitive" (Paris: Bureau central d'imprimerie et de librairie, 1834).
 Recherches historiques sur les Templiers et sur leurs croyances religieuses (Paris: Dentu, 1835).

Further reading
  
 
 Manual of The Knights of the Order of The Temple, Translated by Henry Lucas (Liverpool: David Marples, 1830)
 Alec Mellor, Les Mythes Maçonniques (Paris: Payot, 1974). 
 Manuel des Chevaliers de l'Ordre du Temple (Paris: J.-B. Poulet et Ch.-A. Poulet, 1817-1818), French language version available from Google books

External links
Manual of The Knights of the Order of the Temple, English translation available from Google books
Lévitikon on Gallica website
Ordre Chevaliere du Temple from Google books
Bernard-Raymond Fabrè-Palaprat + 18 February 1838
Ordre Souverain et Militaire du Temple de Jérusalem (OSMTJ)

See also
 Ordo Supremus Militaris Templi Hierosolymitani
 Jules Doinel

References

1773 births
1838 deaths
19th-century French physicians
Self-styled orders